John Ormsby Vandeleur may refer to:
 Sir John Ormsby Vandeleur (1763–1849), British Army general
 John Ormsby Vandeleur (Ennis MP) (1765–1828), Irish landowner and politician, MP for Ennis and Carlow
 John Ormsby Vandeleur (MP for Granard) (1767–1822), Irish politician, MP for Granard 1790–1798